Akshay Naheta (born 23 July 1981) is an Indian-born British business executive who was the CEO of SB Management and senior vice president, investments at SoftBank Group. Naheta has been involved in several high-profile investments, including Auto1 and chipmaker Nvidia, and was the architect behind the pending sale of British software design and semiconductor firm Arm Limited to Nvidia. In early February 2022, Nvidia and Arm agreed to terminate the deal due to significant regulatory challenges, with Arm announcing it will begin preparing for a public offering.

In 2020, he was included in Fortune’s "40 Under 40" most influential people in finance list and was named a World Economic Forum Young Global Leader. In February 2021, he was also listed on GQ India’s 25 Most Influential Young Indians list.

In December 2021, Bloomberg reported that Naheta was in talks to leave SoftBank Group, possibly taking "an advisory role at the firm to focus on his own long-only fund".

Early life and education 
Naheta was born in Mumbai in 1981 to an Indian family of jewelers. He earned a Bachelor of Science in electrical engineering with highest honors from the University of Illinois at Urbana-Champaign (UIUC) in 2003. At UIUC he was a recipient of several awards for academics, research and leadership. In 2020, he received a Young Alumni Achievement Award from the university.

He subsequently obtained an S.M. in electrical engineering and computer science from the Massachusetts Institute of Technology (MIT) in 2004. He dropped out of pursuing a PhD at MIT to begin a career in finance.

Career

Early finance career

Deutsche Bank 
After graduating from MIT, Naheta joined Deutsche Bank as a trader in New York, subsequently relocating to Hong Kong, where he led the proprietary trading business as the head of principal strategies.

Knight Assets & Co. 
Naheta left Deutsche Bank in 2010 and founded Knight Assets & Co. in 2011, an investment manager focused on arbitrage and value investing in companies such as Tata Motors and Rolls-Royce Holdings. By the time Naheta left in 2017, Knight Assets had yielded an internal rate of return of 112.5 percent on $416 million in investments, according to VC Circle.

SoftBank 
In 2017, Naheta joined SoftBank Investment Advisors, an investment manager overseeing the world's largest technology-focused fund, the Vision Fund, where he was responsible for acquisitions and public equity investments.

At the fund, Naheta spearheaded SoftBank's acquisition of a $3.6 billion stake in Silicon Valley-based graphics chipmaker Nvidia in 2017. SoftBank sold its stake in the chipmaker in January 2019, making a profit of $3.3 billion on its investment. During Naheta's time at the Vision Fund, the fund made several other notable investments such as Auto1, Brazilian logistics company Loggi,  Energy Vault, Creditas and Cambridge Mobile Telematics (CMT).

In June 2020, SoftBank named Naheta Senior Vice President of Investments for SoftBank Group Corp, becoming the CEO of a newly formed unit of SoftBank, SB Management, which manages the fund SB Northstar. It was later revealed that SB Northstar was the "Nasdaq Whale" responsible for massive investments in US tech stocks in the summer of 2020.

Sale of Arm to Nvidia 
According to Nikkei, Naheta was "heavily involved" in negotiations between SoftBank and Nvidia about the former's stake in British chip designer Arm Limited. In September 2020, SoftBank announced that it would be selling its stake to Nvidia for $40 billion, after acquiring Arm in 2016 for $32 billion. The deal is expected to see SoftBank take a stake in Nvidia totalling between 6.7% and 8.1%.

The deal was pending regulatory approval, after competition concerns were raised by Google, Microsoft, and Qualcomm and in 2022 the parties agreed to terminate the deal because of significant regulatory challenges.

Wirecard 
Naheta, along with a group of other SoftBank traders, made a convertible bond investment in Wirecard on favorable terms in April 2019, which netted the group instant profits of tens of millions of dollars. The investment, which according to the Wall Street Journal required several conditions to be met including getting Wirecard's 2018 financial results approved by its long-term auditor EY, came from Naheta and other executives from SoftBank, as well as Abu Dhabi’s sovereign wealth fund, the Mubadala Investment Fund. In October 2019, a Financial Times investigation placed Wirecard under scrutiny because of alleged accounting misconduct, later revealing that the company fraudulently inflated over $2 billion in profits. While the investment structure masterminded by Naheta was criticized in its machinations, neither SoftBank nor the investors in the fund that purchased the convertible bond lost money. In June 2020, Naheta criticized Wirecard’s auditor EY in the light of the Wirecard revelations and decried EY’s "lack of competence and responsibility displayed." His criticism was published in an article by the Financial Times after it was revealed that Wirecard and its auditor left "a €1.9bn hole in its balance sheet from cash that probably never existed."

In May 2021, the investigation into Wirecard by the German government confirmed EY's misconduct and reported that the auditor inappropriately issued unqualified audits for Wirecard. The investigation, which concluded on 22 June 2021, heavily criticized EY who “could and should have noticed the accounting fraud” as well as Minister of Finance Olaf Scholz, who “should have stepped in when the country’s financial regulator in 2019 issued a ban on short-selling Wirecard stock.”

SoftBank dubbed "Nasdaq whale" 
In late 2020, the Financial Times revealed that a series of investments in tech giants, which earned SoftBank the title of "Nasdaq Whale", was carried out through SB Northstar. The paper reported that while Naheta was managing SB Northstar, SoftBank's CEO Masayoshi Son was said to have been the "driving force" behind these investments. 

In December 2020, it was reported that SB Northstar was stepping away from such derivatives trading, refocusing on long-term investments instead.

Other investments 
In February 2021, shortly after SB Northstar announced a $900 million convertible bond investment in DNA-sequencing company Pacific Biosciences of California, Bloomberg reported that SoftBank was planning to invest billions in biotech stocks. Subsequently, in August 2021, it was reported that SB Northstar has built a $5 billion stake in Swiss pharmaceutical company Roche Holding AG.

The unit has furthermore invested heavily in other tech platforms, including Norwegian game-based learning platform Kahoot! and Swedish CPaaS platform Sinch.

Naheta also spearheaded the group's acquisition of a 40 percent stake, acquired in Vision Fund II for $2.8 billion, in private Norwegian warehouse automation company AutoStore in April 2021. Following the company's listing on the Oslo Stock Exchange on 20 October 2021, the country's biggest IPO in over two decades and Europe's largest IPO in 2021, SoftBank has almost doubled the value of its investment in less than six months.

Bakkt 
Naheta previously served as a director of ICE-backed digital asset exchange Bakkt Holdings.

On 11 January 2021, Bakkt and Nasdaq-listed VPC Impact Acquisition Holdings, a Special Purpose Acquisition Company sponsored by Victory Park Capital, entered a definitive agreement that will result in Bakkt's listing on the NYSE with an enterprise value of $2.1 billion.

Affiliations 
Naheta is member of the board of directors of Arm Limited.

Awards and honors

References 

1981 births
Living people
21st-century Indian businesspeople
21st-century British businesspeople
Deutsche Bank people
SoftBank people
Massachusetts Institute of Technology alumni
University of Illinois Urbana-Champaign alumni